Radio Al-Hikmah is an online radio station which started established in October, 2020. It is being managed by the Mass Communication Department of the University of Al-Hikmah, Ilorin, Nigeria.

Radio Al-Hikmah frequency is 106.7 FM.

The radio station was established to enhance students capacity in the area of journalism and media related subjects.

References 

Radio stations in Nigeria
Ilorin
2020 establishments in Nigeria